Valerie Louise Pearl (née Bence; 31 December 1926  – 29 January 2016) was a British historian who was noted for her work on the English Civil War. She was the second President of New Hall, Cambridge.

Life
Pearl was the daughter of Cyril Bence, the former Labour Party Member of Parliament for East Dunbartonshire. She was educated at St Anne's College, Oxford, going up in 1946 and gaining a Second-Class degree in Modern History. She subsequently gained a D.Phil. for her thesis, supervised by Christopher Hill, on London and the outbreak of the Puritan Revolution, 1625–1643. This was published in revised form by the Oxford University Press in 1961.

Between 1965 and 1968, Pearl was a lecturer in History at Somerville College, Oxford. Having been offered a Fellowship at Somerville provided she resided in Oxford on a full-time basis, she reluctantly moved to University College, London, as Reader in London History, later holding a chair in the same subject. She was actively involved (with H. J. Dyos) in the foundation of the London Journal (a "Review of Metropolitan Society Past and Present") in 1975, and served as editor of the first five numbers, until 1977. She served as president of the London and Middlesex Archaeological Society in 1980–81.

In 1981 Pearl was appointed as the second President of New Hall, Cambridge, a position she held until 1995.To expand the New Hall Art Collection, she wrote in 1992 to 100 of the leading women artists in Britain and received some 75 donations in return.

Personal life
In 1949, Valerie Bence married Morris Pearl, with whom she had a daughter, Sara.

Publications

References

Further reading

External links
Portrait of Valerie Pearl by Maggi Hambling

1926 births
2016 deaths
Academics of University College London
Alumni of St Anne's College, Oxford
British women historians
English historians
Fellows of New Hall, Cambridge
Fellows of Somerville College, Oxford
Presidents of New Hall, Cambridge